was a Japanese kabuki actor of the Uzaemon acting lineage, also commonly known as . He was an influential actor during the Kaei through Meiji eras of the Japanese imperial calendar. He is best known for his wagotoshi roles.

Early life
Bandō Kakitsu I was born in 1847, the son of kabuki actor Ichimura Takenojō V. On November 1848, Kakitsu appeared on stage for the first time under the stage name Ichimura Takematsu III. His father suddenly grew ill and died on August 20, 1851.

Career
In August 1868, Kakitsu took the name Ichimura Uzaemon XIV in a traditional actor naming ceremony called a shūmei. He became the zamoto (manager, troupe head) of the Ichimura-za.

In November 1868, he produced the play Kanadehon Chūshingura, and played the roles of En'ya Hangan, Ōboshi Rikiya and Ashikaga Tadayoshi.

September 1871 brought debt to the Ichimura-za too great for Kakitsu to handle, forcing him to leave the theater to Fukuchi Mohei, who changed the name to Murayama-za.

Kakitsu returned in November 1871 to perform in the classic Yoshitsune Senbon Zakura.

Kakitsu appeared on stage for the last time in March 1893 in the drama Yamabiraki Meguro Shinfuji. He died soon afterward.

Notable Roles

References 

Kabuki actors
1847 births
1893 deaths
Zamoto
People of Meiji-period Japan